is a Japanese josei manga by Nanae Haruno.  It was serialized in the manga magazine Young You, published by Shueisha.  The chapters were collected into 27 tankōbon.  This manga was awarded the Shogakukan Manga Award for shōjo in 1990, and it was also adapted into a live-action series, broadcast by NHK.  It was shown from April 12 to June 28, 2003, for a total of twelve episodes.

Plot
Chise is an elementary school girl who lives with her widowed father, a novelist.  Her mother died when she was very young, but she is extremely close to her father.  He is the one she loves the most, and because he works as a novelist, he spends most of his time at home, much to the delight of Chise.

References

External links
 Shueisha's page for Papa Told Me 
 NHK's page for the live action drama 
 

2003 Japanese television series debuts
2003 Japanese television series endings
Manga series
Drama anime and manga
Japanese drama television series
Japanese television dramas based on manga
Josei manga
1987 manga
Winners of the Shogakukan Manga Award for shōjo manga
Shueisha franchises
Shueisha manga
NHK original programming